National railway museum is the national railway museum of Sri Lanka, located in Kadugannawa. The railway museum is owned by Sri Lanka Railways.

The museum was opened on 27 December 2014 in order to commemorate the 150th anniversary of railway service in Sri Lanka. Previously, the museum was located in Colombo. The old museum was opened in May 2009.

The museum has old engines, locomotives, rail cars, trolleys, carriages, machineries, and equipments that have been used since the beginning of Sri Lanka Railway.

Opening hours 

The museum is open daily from 9.00 AM to 4.00 PM and closed on Poya days. Payment is by cash at counter, and ticket fee is LKR 10.00 to children with school uniforms, LKR 20.00 to children without school uniforms, LKR 50.00 to adults and LKR 500.00 to foreign citizens.

See also 
 List of museums in Sri Lanka

References 

Museums in Kandy District
National railway museums
Rail transport in Sri Lanka